Alexis Charles Henri Clérel, comte de Tocqueville  (29 July 180516 April 1859), colloquially known as Tocqueville, was a French aristocrat, diplomat, political scientist, political philosopher and historian. He is best known for his works Democracy in America (appearing in two volumes, 1835 and 1840) and The Old Regime and the Revolution (1856). In both, he analyzed the living standards and social conditions of individuals as well as their relationship to the market and state in Western societies. Democracy in America was published after Tocqueville's travels in the United States and is today considered an early work of sociology and political science.

Tocqueville was active in French politics, first under the July Monarchy (1830–1848) and then during the Second Republic (1849–1851) which succeeded the February 1848 Revolution. He retired from political life after Louis Napoléon Bonaparte's 2 December 1851 coup and thereafter began work on The Old Regime and the Revolution. Tocqueville argued the importance of the French Revolution was to continue the process of modernizing and centralizing the French state which had begun under King Louis XIV. He believed the failure of the Revolution came from the inexperience of the deputies who were too wedded to abstract Enlightenment ideals.

Tocqueville was a classical liberal who advocated parliamentary government and was skeptical of the extremes of democracy. During his time in parliament, he was a member of the centre-left, but the complex and restless nature of his liberalism has led to contrasting interpretations and admirers across the political spectrum.

Life 
Tocqueville came from an old aristocratic Parisian family. He was the great-grandson of the statesman Malesherbes, who was guillotined in 1794. His parents, Hervé Louis François Jean Bonaventure Clérel, Count of Tocqueville, an officer of the Constitutional Guard of King Louis XVI; and Louise Madeleine Le Peletier de Rosanbo narrowly escaped the guillotine due to the fall of Maximilien Robespierre in 1794.

Under the Bourbon Restoration, Tocqueville's father became a noble peer and prefect. Tocqueville attended the Lycée Fabert in Metz.

Tocqueville, who despised the July Monarchy (1830–1848), began his political career in 1839. From 1839 to 1851, he served as member of the lower house of parliament for the Manche department (Valognes). He sat on the centre-left, defended abolitionist views and upheld free trade while supporting the colonisation of Algeria carried on by Louis-Philippe's regime.

In 1842, he was elected as a member of the American Philosophical Society.

In 1847, he sought to found a Young Left (Jeune Gauche) party which would advocate wage increases, a progressive tax, and other labor concerns in order to undermine the appeal of the socialists. Tocqueville was also elected general counsellor of Manche in 1842 and became the president of the department's general council between 1849 and 1852; he resigned as he refused to pledge allegiance to the Second Empire. According to one account, Tocqueville's political position became untenable during this time in the sense that he was mistrusted by both the left and right and was looking for an excuse to leave France.

Travels 
In 1831, Tocqueville obtained from the July Monarchy a mission to examine prisons and penitentiaries in the United States and proceeded there with his lifelong friend Gustave de Beaumont. While he did visit some prisons, Tocqueville traveled widely in the United States and took extensive notes on his observations and reflections. He returned within nine months and published a report, but the real result of his tour was De la démocratie en Amérique, which appeared in 1835. Beaumont also wrote an account of their travels in Jacksonian America: Marie or Slavery in the United States (1835). During this trip, Tocqueville made a side trip to Montreal and Quebec City in Lower Canada from mid-August to early September 1831.

Apart from North America, Tocqueville also made an observational tour of England, producing . In 1841 and 1846, he traveled to the French colony of Algeria. His first travel inspired his , in which he criticized the French model of colonisation which emphasized assimilation to Western culture, advocating that the French government instead adopt a form of indirect rule, which avoided mixing different populations together. He went as far as openly advocating racial segregation as a form of consociationalism between European colonists and Arabs through the implementation of two different legislative systems for each ethnic group (a half century before implementation of the 1881 Indigenous code based on religion).

In 1835 Tocqueville journeyed through Ireland. His observations provide one of the best pictures of the state of Ireland before the Great Famine (1845–1849). They chronicle the growing Catholic middle class and the appalling conditions in which most Catholic tenant farmers lived. Tocqueville made clear both his opposition to aristocratic power and his affinity for his Irish co-religionists.

After the fall of the July Monarchy in the French Revolution of 1848, Tocqueville was elected a member of the Constituent Assembly of 1848, where he became a member of the commission charged with the drafting of the new Constitution of the Second Republic (1848–1851). He defended bicameralism and the election of the President of the Republic by universal suffrage. As the countryside was thought to be more conservative than the labouring population of Paris, he conceived of universal suffrage as a means to counteract the revolutionary spirit of Paris.

During the Second Republic, Tocqueville sided with the Party of Order against the socialists. A few days after the February 1848 insurrection, he anticipated that a violent clash between the Parisian workers' population led by socialists agitating in favour of a "Democratic and Social Republic" and the conservatives, which included the aristocracy and the rural population, would be inescapable. Indeed, these social tensions eventually exploded in the June Days Uprising of 1848.

Led by General Cavaignac, the suppression of the uprising was supported by Tocqueville, who advocated the "regularization" of the state of siege declared by Cavaignac and other measures promoting suspension of the constitutional order. Between May and September, Tocqueville participated in the Constitutional Commission which wrote the new Constitution. His proposals, such as his amendment about the President and his reelection, reflected lessons he drew from his North American experience

Minister of Foreign Affairs 

A supporter of Cavaignac and of the Party of Order, Tocqueville accepted an invitation to enter Odilon Barrot's government as Minister of Foreign Affairs from 3 June to 31 October 1849. During the troubled days of June 1849, he pleaded with Interior Minister Jules Armand Dufaure for the reestablishment of the state of siege in the capital and approved the arrest of demonstrators. Tocqueville, who since February 1848 had supported laws restricting political freedoms, approved the two laws voted immediately after the June 1849 days which restricted the liberty of clubs and freedom of the press.

This active support in favor of laws restricting political freedoms stands in contrast of his defense of freedoms in Democracy in America. According to Tocqueville, he favored order as "the sine qua non for the conduct of serious politics. He [hoped] to bring the kind of stability to French political life that would permit the steady growth of liberty unimpeded by the regular rumblings of the earthquakes of revolutionary change″.

Tocqueville had supported Cavaignac against Louis Napoléon Bonaparte for the presidential election of 1848. Opposed to Louis Napoléon Bonaparte's 2 December 1851 coup which followed his election, Tocqueville was among the deputies who gathered at the 10th arrondissement of Paris in an attempt to resist the coup and have Napoleon III judged for "high treason" as he had violated the constitutional limit on terms of office. Detained at Vincennes and then released, Tocqueville, who supported the Restoration of the Bourbons against Napoleon III's Second Empire (1851–1871), quit political life and retreated to his castle.

Against this image of Tocqueville, biographer Joseph Epstein has concluded: "Tocqueville could never bring himself to serve a man he considered a usurper and despot. He fought as best he could for the political liberty in which he so ardently believed—had given it, in all, thirteen years of his life [....]. He would spend the days remaining to him fighting the same fight, but conducting it now from libraries, archives, and his own desk".

Death 
A longtime sufferer from bouts of tuberculosis, Tocqueville would eventually succumb to the disease on 16 April 1859 and was buried in the Tocqueville cemetery in Normandy.

Tocqueville's professed religion was Roman Catholicism. He saw religion as being compatible with both equality and individualism, but felt that religion would be strongest when separated from politics.

Democracy in America 

In Democracy in America, published in 1835, Tocqueville wrote of the New World and its burgeoning democratic order. Observing from the perspective of a detached social scientist, Tocqueville wrote of his travels through the United States in the early 19th century when the Market Revolution, Western expansion and Jacksonian democracy were radically transforming the fabric of American life.

As emphasized in Introduction to Book I, the purpose of the work is somewhat beyond the American democracy itself, which was rather an illustration to the philosophical claim that democracy is an effect of industrialization. In a sense, Tocqueville anticipated Marx’s viewpoint that history is determined by development and changes of socio-economic conditions — the so-called formations that are described by specific productive forces and relations of production. This focus on the philosophy of history justifies a certain ambiguity in using the word 'democracy' and explains why Tocqueville even ignores the intents of the Founding Fathers of the United States regarding the American political system:

According to political scientist Joshua Kaplan, one purpose of writing Democracy in America was to help the people of France get a better understanding of their position between a fading aristocratic order and an emerging democratic order and to help them sort out the confusion. Tocqueville saw democracy as an equation that balanced liberty and equality, concern for the individual as well as for the community.

Tocqueville was an ardent supporter of liberty. "I have a passionate love for liberty, law, and respect for rights", he wrote. "I am neither of the revolutionary party nor of the conservative. [...] Liberty is my foremost passion". He wrote of "Political Consequences of the Social State of the Anglo-Americans" by saying: "But one also finds in the human heart a depraved taste for equality, which impels the weak to want to bring the strong down to their level, and which reduces men to preferring equality in servitude to inequality in freedom".

The above is often misquoted as a slavery quote because of previous translations of the French text. The most recent translation by Arthur Goldhammer in 2004 translates the meaning to be as stated above. Examples of misquoted sources are numerous on the internet such as "Americans are so enamored of equality that they would rather be equal in slavery than unequal in freedom", but the text does not contain the words "Americans were so enamored by equality" anywhere.

His view on government reflects his belief in liberty and the need for individuals to be able to act freely while respecting others' rights. Of centralized government, he wrote that it "excels in preventing, not doing".

Tocqueville continues to comment on equality by saying: "Furthermore, when citizens are all almost equal, it becomes difficult for them to defend their independence against the aggressions of power. As none of them is strong enough to fight alone with advantage, the only guarantee of liberty is for everyone to combine forces. But such a combination is not always in evidence".

Tocqueville explicitly cites inequality as being incentive for the poor to become rich and notes that it is not often that two generations within a family maintain success and that it is inheritance laws that split and eventually break apart someone's estate that cause a constant cycle of churn between the poor and the rich, thereby over generations making the poor rich and the rich poor. He cites protective laws in France at the time that protected an estate from being split apart among heirs, thereby preserving wealth and preventing a churn of wealth such as was perceived by him in 1835 within the United States.

On civil and political society and the individual 

Tocqueville's main purpose was to analyze the functioning of political society and various forms of political associations, although he brought some reflections on civil society too (and relations between political and civil society). For Tocqueville, as for Georg Wilhelm Friedrich Hegel and Karl Marx, civil society was a sphere of private entrepreneurship and civilian affairs regulated by civil code. As a critic of individualism, Tocqueville thought that through associating for mutual purpose, both in public and private, Americans are able to overcome selfish desires, thus making both a self-conscious and active political society and a vibrant civil society functioning according to political and civil laws of the state.

According to political scientist Joshua Kaplan, Tocqueville did not originate the concept of individualism, instead he changed its meaning and saw it as a "calm and considered feeling which deposes each citizen to isolate himself from the mass of his fellows and to withdraw into the circle of family and friends [...]. [W]ith this little society formed to his taste, he gladly leaves the greater society to look for itself". While Tocqueville saw egotism and selfishness as vices, he saw individualism as not a failure of feeling, but as a way of thinking about things which could have either positive consequences such as a willingness to work together, or negative consequences such as isolation and that individualism could be remedied by improved understanding.

When individualism was a positive force and prompted people to work together for common purposes and seen as "self-interest properly understood", then it helped to counterbalance the danger of the tyranny of the majority since people could "take control over their own lives" without government aid. According to Kaplan, Americans have a difficult time accepting Tocqueville's criticism of the stifling intellectual effect of the "omnipotence of the majority" and that Americans tend to deny that there is a problem in this regard.

Others such as the Catholic writer Daniel Schwindt disagree with Kaplan's interpretation, arguing instead that Tocqueville saw individualism as just another form of egotism and not an improvement over it. To make his case, Schwindt provides citations such as the following: Egoism springs from a blind instinct; individualism from wrong-headed thinking rather than from depraved feelings. It originates as much from defects of intelligence as from the mistakes of the heart. Egoism blights the seeds of every virtue; individualism at first dries up only the source of public virtue. In the longer term it attacks and destroys all the others and will finally merge with egoism.

On democracy and new forms of tyranny 

Tocqueville warned that modern democracy may be adept at inventing new forms of tyranny because radical equality could lead to the materialism of an expanding bourgeoisie and to the selfishness of individualism. "In such conditions, we might become so enamored with 'a relaxed love of present enjoyments' that we lose interest in the future of our descendants...and meekly allow ourselves to be led in ignorance by a despotic force all the more powerful because it does not resemble one", wrote The New Yorker'''s James Wood. Tocqueville worried that if despotism were to take root in a modern democracy, it would be a much more dangerous version than the oppression under the Roman emperors or tyrants of the past who could only exert a pernicious influence on a small group of people at a time.

In contrast, a despotism under a democracy could see "a multitude of men", uniformly alike, equal, "constantly circling for petty pleasures", unaware of fellow citizens and subject to the will of a powerful state which exerted an "immense protective power". Tocqueville compared a potentially despotic democratic government to a protective parent who wants to keep its citizens (children) as "perpetual children" and which does not break men's wills, but rather guides it and presides over people in the same way as a shepherd looking after a "flock of timid animals".

 On the American social contract 
Tocqueville's penetrating analysis sought to understand the peculiar nature of American political life. In describing the American, he agreed with thinkers such as Aristotle and Montesquieu that the balance of property determined the balance of political power, but his conclusions after that differed radically from those of his predecessors. Tocqueville tried to understand why the United States was so different from Europe in the last throes of aristocracy. In contrast to the aristocratic ethic, the United States was a society where hard work and money-making was the dominant ethic, where the common man enjoyed a level of dignity which was unprecedented, where commoners never deferred to elites and where what he described as crass individualism and market capitalism had taken root to an extraordinary degree.

Tocqueville writes: "Among a democratic people, where there is no hereditary wealth, every man works to earn a living. [...] Labor is held in honor; the prejudice is not against but in its favor". Tocqueville asserted that the values that had triumphed in the North and were present in the South had begun to suffocate old-world ethics and social arrangements. Legislatures abolished primogeniture and entails, resulting in more widely distributed land holdings. This was a contrast to the general aristocratic pattern in which only the eldest child, usually a man, inherited the estate, which had the effect of keeping large estates intact from generation to generation.

In contrast, landed elites in the United States were less likely to pass on fortunes to a single child by the action of primogeniture, which meant that as time went by large estates became broken up within a few generations which in turn made the children more equal overall. According to Joshua Kaplan's Tocqueville, it was not always a negative development since bonds of affection and shared experience between children often replaced the more formal relation between the eldest child and the siblings, characteristic of the previous aristocratic pattern. Overall, hereditary fortunes in the new democracies became exceedingly difficult to secure and more people were forced to struggle for their own living.

As Tocqueville understood it, this rapidly democratizing society had a population devoted to "middling" values which wanted to amass through hard work vast fortunes. In Tocqueville's mind, this explained why the United States was so different from Europe. In Europe, he claimed, nobody cared about making money. The lower classes had no hope of gaining more than minimal wealth while the upper classes found it crass, vulgar and unbecoming of their sort to care about something as unseemly as money and many were virtually guaranteed wealth and took it for granted. At the same time in the United States, workers would see people fashioned in exquisite attire and merely proclaim that through hard work they too would soon possess the fortune necessary to enjoy such luxuries.

Despite maintaining that the balance of property determined the balance of power, Tocqueville argued that as the United States showed, equitable property holdings did not ensure the rule of the best men. In fact, it did quite the opposite as the widespread, relatively equitable property ownership which distinguished the United States and determined its mores and values also explained why the United States masses held elites in such contempt.

 On majority rule and mediocrity 
Beyond the eradication of old-world aristocracy, ordinary Americans also refused to defer to those possessing, as Tocqueville put it, superior talent and intelligence and these natural elites could not enjoy much share in political power as a result. Ordinary Americans enjoyed too much power and claimed too great a voice in the public sphere to defer to intellectual superiors. This culture promoted a relatively pronounced equality, Tocqueville argued, but the same mores and opinions that ensured such equality also promoted mediocrity. Those who possessed true virtue and talent were left with limited choices.

Tocqueville said that those with the most education and intelligence were left with two choices. They could join limited intellectual circles to explore the weighty and complex problems facing society, or they could use their superior talents to amass vast fortunes in the private sector. He wrote that he did not know of any country where there was "less independence of mind, and true freedom of discussion, than in America".

Tocqueville blamed the omnipotence of majority rule as a chief factor in stifling thinking: "The majority has enclosed thought within a formidable fence. A writer is free inside that area, but woe to the man who goes beyond it, not that he stands in fear of an inquisition, but he must face all kinds of unpleasantness in every day persecution. A career in politics is closed to him for he has offended the only power that holds the keys". According to Kaplan's interpretation of Tocqueville, he argued in contrast to previous political thinkers that a serious problem in political life was not that people were too strong, but that people were "too weak" and felt powerless as the danger is that people felt "swept up in something that they could not control".

 On slavery, blacks and Indians 
Uniquely positioned at a crossroads in American history, Tocqueville's Democracy in America attempted to capture the essence of American culture and values. Although a supporter of colonialism, Tocqueville could clearly perceive the evils that black people and natives had been subjected to in the United States. Tocqueville devoted the last chapter of the first volume of Democracy in America to the question while his travel companion Gustave de Beaumont wholly focused on slavery and its fallouts for the American nation in Marie or Slavery in America. Tocqueville notes among the American races: 

Tocqueville contrasted the settlers of Virginia with the middle class, religious Puritans who founded New England and analyzed the debasing influence of slavery: 

Tocqueville concluded that return of the Black population to Africa could not resolve the problem as he writes at the end of Democracy in America: 

In 1855, Tocqueville wrote the following text published by Maria Weston Chapman in the Liberty Bell: Testimony against Slavery: 

 On policies of assimilation 
According to Tocqueville, assimilation of black people would be almost impossible and this was already being demonstrated in the Northern states. As Tocqueville predicted, formal freedom and equality and segregation would become this population's reality after the Civil War and during Reconstruction as would the bumpy road to true integration of black people.

However, assimilation was the best solution for Native Americans, and since they were too proud to assimilate, they would inevitably become extinct. Displacement was another part of America's Indian policy. Both populations were "undemocratic", or without the qualities, intellectual and otherwise needed to live in a democracy. Tocqueville shared many views on assimilation and segregation of his and the coming epochs, but he opposed Arthur de Gobineau's theories as found in The Inequality of Human Races (1853–1855).

 On the United States and Russia as future global powers 
In his Democracy in America, Tocqueville also forecast the preeminence of the United States and Russia as the two main global powers. In his book, he stated: "There are now two great nations in the world, which starting from different points, seem to be advancing toward the same goal: the Russians and the Anglo-Americans. [...] Each seems called by some secret design of Providence one day to hold in its hands the destinies of half the world".

 On civil jury service 
Tocqueville believed that the American jury system was particularly important in educating citizens in self-government and rule of law. He often expressed how the civil jury system was one of the most effective showcases of democracy because it connected citizens with the true spirit of the justice system. In his 1835 treatise Democracy in America, he explained: "The jury, and more especially the civil jury, serves to communicate the spirit of the judges to the minds of all the citizens; and this spirit, with the habits which attend it, is the soundest preparation for free institutions. [...] It invests each citizen with a kind of magistracy; it makes them all feel the duties which they are bound to discharge toward society; and the part which they take in the Government".

Tocqueville believed that jury service not only benefited the society as a whole, but enhanced jurors' qualities as citizens. Because of the jury system, "they were better informed about the rule of law, and they were more closely connected to the state. Thus, quite independently of what the jury contributed to dispute resolution, participation on the jury had salutary effects on the jurors themselves".

1841 discourse on the Conquest of Algeria
French historian of colonialism Olivier LeCour Grandmaison has underlined how Tocqueville (as well as Jules Michelet) used the term "extermination" to describe what was happening during the colonization of Western United States and the Indian removal period. Tocqueville thus expressed himself in a 1841 essay concerning the conquest of Algeria: 

Tocqueville thought the conquest of Algeria was important for two reasons: first, his understanding of the international situation and France's position in the world; and second, changes in French society. Tocqueville believed that war and colonization would "restore national pride; threatened", he believed, by "the gradual softening of social mores" in the middle classes. Their taste for "material pleasures" was spreading to the whole of society, giving it "an example of weakness and egotism".

Applauding the methods of General Bugeaud, Tocqueville went so far to claim that "war in Africa is a science. Everyone is familiar with its rules and everyone can apply those rules with almost complete certainty of success. One of the greatest services that Field Marshal Bugeaud has rendered his country is to have spread, perfected and made everyone aware of this new science".

Tocqueville advocated racial segregation as a form of consociationalism in Algeria with two distinct legislations, one for European colonists and one for the Arab population. Such a two-tier arrangement would be fully realised with the 1870 Crémieux decree and the Indigenousness Code, which extended French citizenship to European settlers and Algerian Jews whereas Muslim Algerians would be governed by Muslim law and restricted to a second-class citizenship.

 Tocqueville's opposition to the invasion of Kabylie 

In opposition to Olivier Le Cour Grandmaison, Jean-Louis Benoît said that given the extent of racial prejudices during the colonization of Algeria, Tocqueville was one of its "most moderate supporters". Benoît said that it was wrong to assume Tocqueville was a supporter of Bugeaud despite his 1841 apologetic discourse. It seems that Tocqueville modified his views after his second visit to Algeria in 1846 as he criticized Bugeaud's desire to invade Kabylie in an 1847 speech to the Assembly.

Although Tocqueville had favoured retention of distinct traditional law, administrators, schools and so on for Arabs who had come under French control, he judged the Berber tribes of Kabylie (in his second of Two Letters on Algeria, 1837) as "savages" not suited for this arrangement because he argued they would best be managed not by force of arms, but by the pacifying influences of commerce and cultural interaction.

Tocqueville's views on the matter were complex. Although in his 1841 report on Algeria he applauded Bugeaud for making war in a way that defeated Abd-el-Kader's resistance, he had advocated in the Two Letters that the French military advance leave Kabylie undisturbed and in subsequent speeches and writings he continued to oppose intrusion into Kabylie.

In the debate about the 1846 extraordinary funds, Tocqueville denounced Bugeaud's conduct of military operations and succeeded in convincing the Assembly not to vote funds in support of Bugeaud's military columns. Tocqueville considered Bugeaud's plan to invade Kabylie despite the opposition of the Assembly as a seditious act in the face of which the government was opting for cowardice.Tocqueville, III, 1, Gallimard, 1962, pp. 299–306.

 1847 "Report on Algeria" 
In his 1847 "Report on Algeria", Tocqueville declared that Europe should avoid making the same mistake they made with the European colonization of the Americas in order to avoid the bloody consequences. More particularly he reminds his countrymen of a solemn caution whereby he warns them that if the methods used towards the Algerian people remain unchanged, colonization will end in a blood bath.

Tocqueville includes in his report on Algeria that the fate of their soldiers and finances depended on how the French government treats the various native populations of Algeria, including the various Arab tribes, independent Kabyles living in the Atlas Mountains and the powerful political leader Abd-el-Kader. In his various letters and essays on Algeria, Tocqueville discusses contrasting strategies by which a European country can approach imperialism. In particular, the author differentiates between what he terms "dominance" and a particular version of "colonization".

The latter stresses the obtainment and protection of land and passageways that promise commercial wealth. In the case of Algeria, the Port of Algiers and the control over the Strait of Gibraltar were considered by Tocqueville to be particularly valuable whereas direct control of the political operations of the entirety of Algeria was not. Thus, the author stresses domination over only certain points of political influence as a means to colonization of commercially valuable areas.

Tocqueville argued that though unpleasant, domination via violent means is necessary for colonization and justified by the laws of war. Such laws are not discussed in detail, but given that the goal of the French mission in Algeria was to obtain commercial and military interest as opposed to self-defense, it can be deduced that Tocqueville would not concur with just war theory's jus ad bellum criteria of just cause. Further, given that Tocqueville approved of the use of force to eliminate civilian housing in enemy territory, his approach does not accord with just war theory's jus in bello criteria of proportionality and discrimination.

 The Old Regime and the Revolution 

In 1856, Tocqueville published The Old Regime and the Revolution. The book analyzes French society before the French Revolution—the so-called Ancien Régime—and investigates the forces that caused the Revolution.

 References in popular literature 
Tocqueville was quoted in several chapters of Toby Young's memoirs How to Lose Friends and Alienate People to explain his observation of widespread homogeneity of thought even amongst intellectual elites at Harvard University during his time spent there. He is frequently quoted and studied in American history classes. Tocqueville is the inspiration for Australian novelist Peter Carey in his 2009 novel Parrot and Olivier in America.

 Works 
 Alexis de Tocqueville and Gustave de Beaumont in America: Their Friendship and Their Travels, edited by Olivier Zunz, translated by Arthur Goldhammer (University of Virginia Press, 2011), 698 pages. Includes previously unpublished letters, essays, and other writings.
  (1833) – On the Penitentiary System in the United States and Its Application to France, with Gustave de Beaumont.
  (1835/1840) – Democracy in America. It was published in two volumes, the first in 1835, the second in 1840. English language versions: Tocqueville, Democracy in America, trans. and eds, Harvey C. Mansfield and Delba Winthrop, University of Chicago Press, 2000; Tocqueville, Democracy in America (Arthur Goldhammer, trans.; Olivier Zunz, ed.) (The Library of America, 2004) .
  (1856) – The Old Regime and the Revolution. It is Tocqueville's second most famous work.
 Recollections (1893) – This work was a private journal of the Revolution of 1848. He never intended to publish this during his lifetime; it was published by his wife and his friend Gustave de Beaumont after his death.
 Journey to America (1831–1832) – Alexis de Tocqueville's travel diary of his visit to America; translated into English by George Lawrence, edited by J.-P. Mayer, Yale University Press, 1960; based on vol.
 L'État social et politique de la France avant et depuis 1789 – Alexis de Tocqueville
 Memoir on Pauperism: Does public charity produce an idle and dependant class of society? (1835) originally published by Ivan R. Dee. Inspired by a trip to England. One of Tocqueville's more obscure works.
 Journeys to England and Ireland, 1835.

 See also 

 The Alexis de Tocqueville Tour: Exploring Democracy in America Alexis de Tocqueville Institution
 Benjamin Constant, author of Liberty of the Ancients and the Moderns Gustave de Beaumont, Tocqueville's best friend and travel companion to the United States
 Ferdinand de Lesseps, French diplomat and developer of Suez Canal
 Prix Alexis de Tocqueville
 Tocqueville effect, a social phenomenon

 General
 Civil society
 Contributions to liberal theory
 Liberalism
 List of historians of the French Revolution
 Soft despotism
 Tyranny of the majority

 References 

 Further reading 
 Allen, Barbara. Tocqueville, Covenant, and the Democratic Revolution: Harmonizing Earth with Heaven. Lanham, MD: Lexington Books, 2005.
 Allen, James Sloan. "Alexis de Tocqueville: Democracy in America." Worldly Wisdom: Great Books and the Meanings of Life. Savannah, GA: Frederic C. Beil, 2008.
 Benoît, Jean-Louis. Comprendre Tocqueville. Paris: Armand Colin/Cursus, 2004.
 Benoît, Jean-Louis, and Eric Keslassy. Alexis de Tocqueville: Textes économiques Anthologie critique. Paris: Pocket/Agora, 2005. See "Jean-Louis Benoit".
 Benoît, Jean-Louis. Tocqueville, Notes sur le Coran et autres textes sur les religions. Paris : Bayard, 2005. See also "Relectures de Tocqueville" and "Tocqueville aurait-il enfin trouvé ses juges ? Ôter son masque au parangon de la vertu démocratique".
 Boesche, Roger. The Strange Liberalism of Alexis de Tocqueville. Ithaca, NY: Cornell University Press, 1987.
 Boesche, Roger. Tocqueville's Road Map: Methodology, Liberalism, Revolution, and Despotism. Lnahma, MD: Lexington Books, 2006.
 Brogan, Hugh. Alexis De Tocqueville. London: Profile Books, and New Haven, CT: Yale University Press, 2006.
 Cossu-Beaumont, Laurence. Marie ou l'esclavage aux Etats-Unis de Gustave de Beaumont (1835). Paris: Forges de Vulcain, 2014. .
 Coutant, Arnaud. Tocqueville et la Constitution democratique. Mare et Martin, 2008.
 Coutant, Arnaud. Une Critique républicaine de la démocratie libérale, de la démocratie en Amérique de Tocqueville. Mare et Martin, 2007.
 Craiutu, Aurelian, and Jeremy Jennings, eds. Tocqueville on America after 1840: Letters and Other Writings. (New York: Cambridge University Press, 2009) 560 pp. .
 Damrosch, Leo. Tocqueville's Discovery of America. New York: Farrar Straus Giroux, 2010.
 Drescher Seymour. Tocqueville and England. Cambridge, MA: Harward University Press, 1964.
 Drescher, Seymour. Dilemmas of Democracy: Tocqueville and Modernization. Pittsburgh, PA: University of Pittsburgh Press, 1968.
 Epstein, Joseph. Alexis De Tocqueville: Democracy's Guide. New York: Atlas Books, 2006.
 Feldman, Jean-Philippe. "Alexis de Tocqueville et le fédéralisme américain". Revue du droit public et de la science politique en France et à l'Étranger, n° 4 (20 June 2006): 879–901.
 Galbo, Joseph. "Ethnographies of empire and resistance: 'wilderness' and the 'vanishing Indian' in Alexis de Tocqueville's 'A Fortnight in the Wilderness' and John Tanner's Narrative of Captivity". The International Journal of Interdisciplinary Social Sciences. Vol. 4 (5) 2009: 197-212. (Academia)
 Gannett, Robert T. Tocqueville Unveiled: The Historian and His Sources for the Old Regime and the Revolution. Chicago, IL: University of Chicago Press, 2003.
 Geenens, Raf and Annelien De Dijn (eds), Reading Tocqueville: From Oracle to Actor. London: Palgrave Macmillan. 2007.
 Hein, David. "Christianity and Honor." The Living Church, 18 August 2013, pp. 8–10.
 Herr, Richard. Tocqueville and the Old Regime. Princeton, NJ: Princeton University Press, 1962.
 Jardin, Andre. Tocqueville. New York: Farrar Straus Giroux, 1989.
 Jaume, Lucien, Tocqueville. Bayard, 2008.
 Kahan, Alan S. Aristocratic Liberalism : The Social and Political Thought of Jacob Burckhardt, Johns Stuart Mill and Alexis de Tocqueville. Oxford and New York: Oxford University Press, 1992; Transaction, 2001.
 Kahan, Alan S. Alexis de Tocqueville. New York: Continuum, 2010.
 
 Lively, Jack. The Social and Political Thought of Alexis De Tocqueville. Oxford: Clarendon Press of Oxford University Press, 1962.
 Mansfield, Harvey C. Tocqueville: A Very Short Introduction. Oxford and New York: Oxford University Press, 2010.
 Mélonio, Françoise. Tocqueville and the French. Charlottesville: University of Virginia Press, 1998.
 Mitchell, Harvey. Individual Choice and the Structures of History – Alexis de Tocqueville as an historian reappraised. Cambridge, Eng.: Cambridge University Press, 1996.
 Mitchell, Joshua. The Fragility of Freedom: Tocqueville on Religion, Democracy, and the American Future. Chicago, IL: University of Chicago Press, 1995.
 Pierson, George. Tocqueville and Beaumont in America. New York: Oxford University Press, 1938. Reissued as Tocqueville in America. Baltimore: Johns Hopkins University Press, 1996.
 Pitts, Jennifer. A Turn to Empire. Princeton, NJ: Princeton University Press, 2005.
 Sanders, Luk. "The Strange Belief of Alexis de Tocqueville: Christianity as Philosophy". International Journal of Philosophy and Theology, 74:1 (2013): 33–53.
 Schuettinger, Robert. "Tocqueville and the Bland Leviathan". New Individualist Review, Volume 1, Number 2 (Summer 1961): 12–17.
 Schleifer, James T. The Chicago Companion to Tocqueville's Democracy in America. Chicago: University of Chicago Press, 2012. .
 Schleifer, James T. The Making of Tocqueville's Democracy in America. Chapell Hill: University of North Carolina Press, 1980; second ed., Indianapolis, IN: Liberty Fund, 1999.
 Shiner, L. E. The Secret Mirror: Literary Form and History in Tocqueville's Recollections Ithaca, NY: Cornell University Press, 1988.
 Swedberg, Richard Tocqueville's Political Economy Princeton: Princeton University Press, 2009.
 Welch, Cheryl. De Tocqueville. Oxford: Oxford University Press, 2001.
 Welch, Cheryl. The Cambridge Companion to Tocqueville. Cambridge, Eng., and New York: Cambridge University Press, 2006.
 Williams, Roger L., "Tocqueville on Religion," Journal of the Historical Society, 8:4 (2008): 585–600.
 Wolin, Sheldon. Tocqueville Between Two Worlds''. Princeton, NJ: Princeton University Press, 2001.

External links 

 
 
 
 
 
 
 
  Works in the original French.
 Yale Tocqueville Manuscripts. General Collection, Beinecke Rare Book and Manuscript Library, Yale University.
 

1805 births
1859 deaths
19th-century French male writers
19th-century French philosophers
Chevaliers of the Légion d'honneur
Economic sociologists
French classical liberals
French conservative liberals
French diplomats
19th-century French historians
French male non-fiction writers
Counts of France
French philosophers
French political philosophers
French political scientists
French political writers
French Roman Catholics
French sociologists
Historians of the French Revolution
Historians of the United States
Members of the 1848 Constituent Assembly
Members of the 5th Chamber of Deputies of the July Monarchy
Members of the 6th Chamber of Deputies of the July Monarchy
Members of the 7th Chamber of Deputies of the July Monarchy
Members of the Académie Française
Members of the National Legislative Assembly of the French Second Republic
Party of Order politicians
Philosophers of culture
Philosophers of history
Philosophers of law
Political philosophers
Politicians from Paris
Social philosophers
Writers from Paris